The 2019 Nepal Basketball League also known as Kwiks Basketball League for sponsorship reasons, was the second season of Nepal Basketball League. The league began on 20 April 2019.

A total of eight teams took part in the league which ran for 55 days, making it the biggest and longest basketball tournament of the country.

The Times International Club secured their first title after defeating Nepal Army Club in the final.

Teams

Regular season

League table

Results

Playoffs

(1) Tribhuwan Army Club vs. (2) The Times International Club

(3) Golden Gate International Club vs. (4) Nepal Police Club

(2) The Times International Club vs. (4) Nepal Police Club

Final: (1) Tribhuwan Army Club vs. (2) The Times International Club

Season statistics

Regular season

Women's Nepal Basketball League 
The 2019 Women's Nepal Basketball League was the first season of the Women's Nepal Basketball League. Four teams took part in the inaugural season which began on 1 June. 

Nepal Police Club became the inaugural champions after defeating Samridhhi Gorilas in the final.

Teams 

 Iso Kite
 Nepal Police Club
 Saipal Academy
 Samriddhi Gorillas

Regular season

League table

Results

Final

See also 

 Nepal national basketball team
 2018 Nepal Basketball League season

References 

Kwiks Basketball League
Kwiks Basketball League
Basketball in Nepal